Chipozi zhuan, translated into English as The Story of the Foolish Woman, Biography of a Foolish Woman or A Tale of an Infatuated Woman, is a Chinese erotic novella written in the Ming dynasty.

Plot
Told through first-person narration, the novella recounts the sexual exploits of a septuagenarian named Shangguan E'Nuo ("Graceful"), who at various points in her life has sex with twelve men including her cousin, her male servants, her husband, her two brothers-in-law, her father-in-law, as well as a pair of Buddhist monks; after being expelled from her husband's residence at age 39, she becomes a pariah and claims to have not had sex for three decades.

Publication history
Chipozi zhuan was "compiled" or written by an anonymous writer using the pseudonym "Lotus Lord" and edited by "Passion-Infatuated Philosopher". It was composed in Classical Chinese during the mid- to late sixteenth century, at about the same time that Jin Ping Mei was published. At just over 10,000 Chinese characters, Chipozi zhuan is technically a novella. Chipozi zhuan was evidently in circulation before 1612, because it is mentioned in a preface to the novel Dong Xi Jin yanyi (The Romance of the Eastern and Western Jin) that was published in that year. It was constantly banned after its publication for being a "lascivious and obscene work", and the earliest existing edition of the text dates to 1764.

Literary significance and reception
According to Paola Zamperini, Chipozi zhuan is "seen as one of the first pornographic sources within the history of Chinese literature". Alongside Ruyijun zhuan (The Lord of Perfect Satisfaction) and Xiuta yeshi (The Embroidered Couch), Chipozi zhuan is one of the three erotic works referenced in The Carnal Prayer Mat believed to have been written by Qing dynasty writer Li Yu. Wu Cuncun states that Chipozi zhuan "can be regarded as an early representative work in narrating a series of sexual adventures of a woman from an unexceptional and relatively modest urban household." The novella also uses a first-person female narrator, which is described by Zamperini as "a very rare event ... (that) breaks strikingly with both previous and later narrative modes and models."

Martin W. Huang writes that the novella should be considered as one of the earliest fictional works published in China to champion "feminine authority", in that the protagonist E'Nuo is "not only a desiring subject but ... also a speaking subject, who had the discursive power to define and interpret her own subjectivity." In dissent, Hoi Yan Chu argues that Chipozi zhuan "is illusory and constructed based on a male perspective" and whose "patriarchy implications are mainly shown in its triple denial to female desire through showing female unsuccessful attempts to actively pursue sexual pleasure, emphasizing passivity as the only way for female sexual pleasure and punishing females."

References

Citations

Bibliography

See also

Works published under a pseudonym
17th-century Chinese novels
Chinese novellas
Incest in fiction
Ming dynasty novels
Chinese erotic novels